Jean-Marie Serreau (28 April 1915 – 22 May 1973) was a 20th-century French actor, theatre director and a former student of Charles Dullin.

He created works by avant gardist playwrights such as Samuel Beckett, Jean Genet and Eugène Ionesco, as well as works by Kateb Yacine and Aimé Césaire.

Married to Geneviève Serreau, herself an author and theatre director, he was Dominique Serreau's, Coline Serreau's and Nicolas Serreau's father.

Career

Comedies 
1938: La Jalousie du barbouillé by Molière, directed by Jean-Marie Serreau, tour in Béarn
1943: Monsieur de Pourceaugnac by Molière, directed by Charles Dullin, Théâtre de la Cité (extra)
1945: Le Faiseur by Honoré de Balzac, directed by Charles Dullin, Théâtre de la Cité
1946: La Femme silencieuse by Marcel Achard after Ben Jonson, directed by Jean-Marie Serreau, tour in Germany
1947: The Trial by Franz Kafka, adaptation André Gide, directed by Jean-Louis Barrault, Théâtre Marigny
1947: Androcles and the Lion by George Bernard Shaw, directed by Christine Tsingos, Théâtre de la Gaîté-Montparnasse
1948: Le Portefeuille by Octave Mirbeau, directed by Christine Tsingos, Théâtre de la Gaîté-Montparnasse
1949: George Dandin by Molière, directed by Jean-Marie Serreau et François Vibert, tours in France and West-Germany, M de Sottenville
1949: Le Bossu by Paul Féval and Auguste Anicet-Bourgeois, directed by Jean-Louis Barrault, Théâtre Marigny
1950: The Exception and the Rule by Bertolt Brecht, directed by Jean-Marie Serreau, 
1950: Le Gardien du tombeau by Franz Kafka, directed by Jean-Marie Serreau, Poche Montparnasse
1952: La Jarre by Luigi Pirandello, directed by Jacques Mauclair, Théâtre de Babylone
1952: Spartacus by Max Aldebert, directed by Jean-Marie Serreau, Théâtre de Babylone
1952: Méfie-toi, Giacomino by Luigi Pirandello, directed by Jacques Mauclair, Théâtre de Babylone
1952: Cecè by Luigi Pirandello, directed by Jacques Mauclair, Théâtre de Babylone
1952: La Maison brûlée by August Strindberg, directed by Frank Sundström, Théâtre de Babylone
1953: Tous contre tous by Arthur Adamov, directed by Jean-Marie Serreau, Théâtre de Babylone
1954: Bellavita by Luigi Pirandello, directed by Jean-Marie Serreau, Théâtre Marigny
1954: Man Equals Man by Bertolt Brecht, directed by Jean-Marie Serreau, Théâtre des Célestins, Théâtre de l'Œuvre 
1956: Chaud et froid by Fernand Crommelynck, directed by the author, Théâtre de l'Œuvre
1956: Le Paria by August Strindberg, directed by Michel Etcheverry, Théâtre de l'Œuvre
1956: The Lower Depths by Maxim Gorky, directed by Sacha Pitoëff, Théâtre de l'Œuvre
1958: Lorsque cinq ans seront passés by Federico García Lorca, directed by Guy Suarès, Théâtre Récamier
1959: The Killer by Eugène Ionesco, directed by José Quaglio, Théâtre Récamier
1960: Un barrage contre le Pacifique de Marguerite Duras, adaptation Geneviève Serreau, directed by Jean-Marie Serreau, Studio des Champs-Élysées
1960: Biedermann et les incendiaires by Max Frisch, directed by Jean-Marie Serreau, Théâtre de Lutèce
1961: Amédée, or How to Get Rid of It by Eugène Ionesco, directed by Jean-Marie Serreau, Théâtre de l'Odéon
1962: The Picture by Eugène Ionesco, directed by Jean-Marie Serreau, Théâtre de l'Œuvre
1962: L'avenir est dans les œufs ou il faut de tout pour faire un monde by Eugène Ionesco, directed by Jean-Marie Serreau, Théâtre de la Gaîté-Montparnasse
1962: The Picture by Eugène Ionesco, directed by Jean-Marie Serreau, Théâtre de l'Œuvre
1962: Biedermann et les incendiaires by Max Frisch, directed by Jean-Marie Serreau, Théâtre Récamier
1963: L'avenir est dans les œufs ou il faut de tout pour faire un monde by Eugène Ionesco, directed by Jean-Marie Serreau, Théâtre de l'Ambigu
1963: Amédée, or How to Get Rid of It by Eugène Ionesco, directed by Jean-Marie Serreau, Théâtre de l'Ambigu
1963: La Femme sauvage ou Le Cadavre encerclé by Kateb Yacine, directed by Jean-Marie Serreau, Théâtre Récamier
1965: La Tragédie du roi Christophe by Aimé Césaire, directed by Jean-Marie Serreau, Odéon
1966: Eris de Lee Falk, directed by Georges Vitaly, Théâtre La Bruyère
1966: Mêlées et démêlées by Eugène Ionesco, directed by Georges Vitaly, Théâtre La Bruyère
1967: Une saison au Congo by Aimé Césaire, directed by Jean-Marie Serreau, Théâtre de l'Est parisien
1970: The Death of Bessie Smith by Edward Albee, directed by Jean-Marie Serreau

Films 
1938: L’Impromptu de Barbe Bleu by Pierre Barbier, tour in Béarn
1938: La Jalousie du barbouillé by Molière, tour in Béarn
1946: Le Marchand d'étoiles by Geneviève Serreau, Théâtre des Bouffes du Nord
1946: La Femme silencieuse by Marcel Achard after Ben Jonson, tour in West-Germany
1947: Farce enfantine de la tête du Dragon by Ramón María del Valle-Inclán, tour
1947: The Exception and the Rule by Bertolt Brecht, Théâtre des Noctambules
1948: L'Auberge Pleine by Jean Variot, tour
1948: Le Paquebot Tenacity by Charles Vildrac, tour
1949: George Dandin by Molière, with François Vibert, setting François Ganeau, tours in France and West-Germany
1950: The Exception and the Rule by Bertolt Brecht, Poche Montparnasse
1950: Le Gardien du tombeau by Franz Kafka, Poche Montparnasse
1950: Le Roi Cerf by Carlo Gozzi, tour
1950: La Grande et la Petite Manœuvre by Arthur Adamov, Théâtre des Noctambules
1952: Spartacus by Max Aldebert, Théâtre de Babylone
1952: La Maison brûlée by August Strindberg, Théâtre de Babylone
1953: Tous contre tous by Arthur Adamov, Théâtre de Babylone
1953: La Rose des vents by Charles Spaak, Théâtre de Babylone
1953: L'Incendie à l'Opéra by Georges Kaiser, Théâtre de Babylone
1954: Bellavita by Luigi Pirandello, Théâtre Marigny
1954: Amédée, or How to Get Rid of It by Eugène Ionesco, Théâtre de Babylone
1954: Man Equals Man by Bertolt Brecht, Théâtre des Célestins, Théâtre de l'Œuvre
1955: An Ideal Husband by Oscar Wilde, Théâtre de l'Œuvre
1956: Hommage à Brecht by Geneviève Serreau and Antoine Vitez, Théâtre de l'Alliance française
1957: Amédée, or How to Get Rid of It by Eugène Ionesco, Théâtre de l'Alliance française
1957: Les Coréens by Michel Vinaver, Théâtre de l'Alliance française
1958: Le Cadavre encerclé by Kateb Yacine, Théâtre de Lutèce
1959: Pique-nique en campagne by Fernando Arrabal, Théâtre de Lutèce
1960: Un barrage contre le Pacifique by Marguerite Duras, adaptation Geneviève Serreau, Studio des Champs-Élysées
1960: Hommage à Paul Éluard, Théâtre de l'Ambigu
1960: Biedermann et les incendiaires by Max Frisch, Théâtre de Lutèce
1961: La Rouille by Carlos Semprún Maura, Théâtre de l'Alliance française
1961: The Maids by Jean Genet, Théâtre de l'Odéon
1961: Amédée, or How to Get Rid of It by Eugène Ionesco, Théâtre de l'Odéon
1962: Tilt by Philippe Curval, Théâtre Récamier
1962: Gilda appelle Mae-West by Michel Parent, 9th Festival des Nuits de Bourgogne Dijon 
1962: The Picture by Eugène Ionesco, Théâtre de l'Œuvre, Théâtre de la Gaîté-Montparnasse
1962: The Maids by Jean Genet, Théâtre de l'Œuvre 
1962: Amédée, or How to Get Rid of It by Eugène Ionesco, Théâtre de la Gaîté-Montparnasse
1962: L'avenir est dans les œufs ou il faut de tout pour faire un monde by Eugène Ionesco, Théâtre de la Gaîté-Montparnasse
1962: The Picture by Eugène Ionesco, Théâtre de l'Œuvre
1962: Amédée, or How to Get Rid of It by Eugène Ionesco, Théâtre de l'Ambigu
1962: Biedermann et les incendiaires by Max Frisch, Théâtre Récamier
1963: La Femme sauvage ou Le Cadavre encerclé by Kateb Yacine, Théâtre Récamier
1964: Comédie by Samuel Beckett, Théâtre du Pavillon de Marsan 
1965: La Tragédie du roi Christophe by Aimé Césaire, Odéon
1966: Comédie by Samuel Beckett, Théâtre de l'Odéon
1966: La Soif et la faim by Eugène Ionesco, Comédie-Française
1966: Va et vient by Samuel Beckett, Odéon 
1967: Les ancêtres redoublent de férocité de Kateb Yacine, TNP Théâtre de Chaillot
1967: Une saison au Congo by Aimé Césaire, La Fenice, Théâtre de l'Est parisien
1968: L'Otage by Paul Claudel, Comédie-Française
1968: Les Rosenberg ne doivent pas mourir by Alain Decaux, Tréteaux de France
1968: Drôle de baraque by Adrienne Kennedy, Odéon 
1968: Uhuru after Aimé Césaire and Kateb Yacine, Théâtre de l'Hôtel de Ville du Havre 
1968: Arc-en-ciel pour l'Occident chrétien de René Depestre, Théâtre de la Cité internationale
1968: Les Rosenberg ne doivent pas mourir by Alain Decaux, Tréteaux de France, 1969: Théâtre de la Porte-Saint-Martin
1969: Comédie by Samuel Beckett, Théâtre de Poche Montparnasse
1969: Le Pain dur by Paul Claudel, Comédie-Française
1969: Une Tempête by Aimé Césaire after William Shakespeare, Théâtre de l'Ouest parisien, Théâtre de la Cité internationale
1970: The Death of Bessie Smith by Edward Albee, Théâtre du Midi
1971: Amédée, or How to Get Rid of It by Eugène Ionesco, Poche Montparnasse
1971: Béatrice du Congo by Bernard Dadié, Festival d'Avignon
1972: Le Printemps des bonnets rouges by Paol Keineg, Théâtre de la Tempête

References

External links 
 
  Les Archives du Spectacle

1915 births
People from Poitiers
1973 deaths
20th-century French male actors
French theatre directors
French theatre managers and producers